The England national wheelchair rugby league team represents England in wheelchair rugby league. The team have played in all four World Cup tournaments, winning both the inaugural competition in 2008 and the 2021 edition on home soil, and being runners up in both 2013 and 2017. They also won the 2015 European Wheelchair Rugby League Championship.

The team was established in 2007 under the auspices of the British Wheelchair Tag Rugby League Association and played its first test match, against France the same year.

The team are sponsored by Betfred in a two-year deal signed in 2022 that included the wheelchair, men's and women's teams. They train at Calderdale College in Halifax.

Current squad 
Squad selected for the 2021 Rugby League World Cup (played in 2022 due to the COVID-19 pandemic).
 Tom Coyd (Coach)
 Sebastien Bechara (Catalans Dragons)
 Jack Brown (Halifax Panthers)
 Wayne Boardman (Halifax Panthers)
 Nathan Collins (Leeds Rhinos)
 Joe Coyd (London Roosters)
 Rob Hawkins (Halifax Panthers)
 Tom Halliwell (Leeds Rhinos)
 Lewis King (London Roosters)
 Adam Rigby (Wigan Warriors)
 Declan Roberts (Wigan Warriors)
 James Simpson (Leeds Rhinos)

Competitive record

Results

Records and statistics

The team has only ever lost to France, the originators of the wheelchair game. England's biggest defeat was 31–71 on 20 July 2017.

England's biggest win was 136–1 over Scotland on 28 September 2019; their biggest win without conceding was 121–0 over Ireland on 9 November 2022.

Honours
World Cup (2): (2008, 2021)
European Championship (1): (2015)
Four/Tri Nations (4): (2012, 2014, 2016, 2019)

See also

 Rugby league in England
 England men's national rugby league team
 England women's national rugby league team
 Rugby Football League
 British Rugby League Hall of Fame

Notes

References

Disability in England
Rugby league in England
National wheelchair rugby league teams